One Paseo is a  mixed-use development in Carmel Valley, San Diego, at the southwest corner of Del Mar Heights Road and El Camino Real. It had a soft opening in March 2019 and will have a total of 96,000 square feet of retail and restaurants, 280,000 square feet of office space and 608 luxury apartments. This was reduced from an original plan for more density in a 2015 compromise with community groups.

Tenants include Sephora, Soul Cycle, Shake Shack, CAVA, Salt & Straw and Blue Bottle Coffee. International Smoke is a restaurant by San Francisco celebrity chef Michael Mina and cookbook author Ayesha Curry.

References

Mixed-use developments in California
Carmel Valley, San Diego
Shopping malls in San Diego County, California